Jenny Marie Beatrice Addams (15 February 1909 – 1990) was a Belgian fencer. She competed at four Olympic Games.

References

External links
 

1909 births
1990 deaths
Belgian female foil fencers
Olympic fencers of Belgium
Fencers at the 1928 Summer Olympics
Fencers at the 1932 Summer Olympics
Fencers at the 1936 Summer Olympics
Fencers at the 1948 Summer Olympics
Sportspeople from Brussels
20th-century Belgian women